Earthquakes in Algeria occur in the north part of the country, usually north of 35° N. latitude, and occasionally as submarine earthquakes in the Mediterranean Sea. On at least one occasion, this type of event has generated a destructive tsunami.

Earthquakes

See also
Geology of Algeria

References 

Sources

Further reading
 
 

Algeria

Lists of events in Algeria
Tsunamis in Algeria